The Nicholas Rescher Prize for Systematic Philosophy was established by the University of Pittsburgh in 2009 to counter present-day tendencies to narrow specialization by rewarding and showcasing the work of philosophers who have addressed the historical “big questions” of the field in ways that nevertheless command the respect of specialists. Awarded biennially the prize consists of a gold medal together with a sum of $25,000. The prize is named for Nicholas Rescher, Distinguished University Professor of Philosophy, who has served on the university’s faculty for over 50 years. The recipients to date are: Ernest Sosa (2010), Alvin Plantinga (2012, joint award) and Jürgen Mittelstraß (2012, joint award), Hilary Putnam (2015), and Ruth Millikan (2017).

References

University of Pittsburgh
Philosophy awards
Awards established in 2009